Genoa was a restaurant in Portland, Oregon's Sunnyside neighborhood, in the United States. Housed in the Genoa Building, the Italian restaurant closed permanently in 2014.

See also
 List of defunct restaurants of the United States
 List of Italian restaurants

References

External links

 Genoa at Zagat

2014 disestablishments in Oregon
Defunct Italian restaurants in Portland, Oregon
Restaurants disestablished in 2014
Sunnyside, Portland, Oregon